This is a glossary of terms specific to differential geometry and differential topology. The following three glossaries are closely related:
Glossary of general topology
Glossary of algebraic topology
Glossary of Riemannian and metric geometry.

See also:
List of differential geometry topics

Words in italics denote a self-reference to this glossary.



A

 Atlas

B

 Bundle – see fiber bundle.

C

 Chart

 Cobordism

 Codimension – The codimension of a submanifold is the dimension of the ambient space minus the dimension of the submanifold.

 Connected sum

 Connection

 Cotangent bundle – the vector bundle of cotangent spaces on a manifold.

 Cotangent space

D

As the result we get a manifold without boundary.

E

 Embedding

F

 Fiber bundle

 Frame – A frame at a point of a differentiable manifold M is a basis of the tangent space at the point.

 Frame bundle – the principal bundle of frames on a smooth manifold.

 Flow

G

 Genus

H

 Hypersurface – A hypersurface is a submanifold of codimension one.

I

 Immersion

 Integration along fibers

L

 Lens space – A lens space is a quotient of the 3-sphere (or (2n + 1)-sphere) by a free isometric action of Z – k.

M

 Manifold – A topological manifold is a locally Euclidean Hausdorff space. (In Wikipedia, a manifold need not be paracompact or second-countable.) A  manifold is a differentiable manifold whose chart overlap functions are k times continuously differentiable. A  or smooth manifold is a differentiable manifold whose chart overlap functions are infinitely continuously differentiable.

N
 Neat submanifold – A submanifold whose boundary equals its intersection with the boundary of the manifold into which it is embedded.

O 
 Orientation of a vector bundle

P

 Parallelizable – A smooth manifold is parallelizable if it admits a smooth global frame. This is equivalent to the tangent bundle being trivial.

 Poincaré lemma

 Pullback

S

 Section

 Submanifold – the image of a smooth embedding of a manifold.

 Submersion

 Surface – a two-dimensional manifold or submanifold.

 Systole – least length of a noncontractible loop.

T

 Tangent bundle – the vector bundle of tangent spaces on a differentiable manifold.

 Tangent field – a section of the tangent bundle. Also called a vector field.

 Tangent space

 Thom space

 Torus

 Transversality – Two submanifolds  and  intersect transversally if at each point of intersection p their tangent spaces  and  generate the whole tangent space at p of the total manifold.

 Trivialization

V

 Vector bundle – a fiber bundle whose fibers are vector spaces and whose transition functions are linear maps.

 Vector field – a section of a vector bundle. More specifically, a vector field can mean a section of the tangent bundle.

W

 Whitney sum – A Whitney sum is an analog of the direct product for vector bundles.

Geometry

 
Wikipedia glossaries using unordered lists